Home and Away is an Australian television soap opera. It was first broadcast on the Seven Network on 17 January 1988. The following is a list of characters that appeared in 2017, by order of first appearance. All characters are introduced by the soap's executive producer, Lucy Addario. The 30th season of Home and Away began airing from 30 January 2017. Riley Hawkins was introduced during the following episode. Scarlett Snow made her debut in May, while June saw the arrival of the four-strong Astoni family consisting of parents Ben and Maggie Astoni, and their daughters Coco and Ziggy Astoni. Robbo and Jennifer Dutton made their first appearances in July, and Beth Ellis was introduced in August. Ryder Jackson make his debut in October. November saw the first appearance of Willow Harris, and Jasmine Delaney arrived in December.

Riley Hawkins

Riley Hawkins, played by Ryan O'Kane, made his first appearance on 31 January 2017. O'Kane's housemate Rob Mills also auditioned for the role. He was waiting for his agent to let him know the outcome when O'Kane revealed that he had won the part. Riley is introduced as Tori Morgan's (Penny McNamee) former boyfriend and a surgeon at the local hospital, who steps in to perform surgery on Justin Morgan (James Stewart). McNamee said the moment Tori is reunited with Riley is "shocking" for her because she has not seen him in seven years. While Riley is surprised to learn that Tori and her siblings have been in witness protection. Fellow doctor Nate Cooper (Kyle Pryor), who broke up with Tori, is jealous of her history with Riley.

On his first day at Northern Districts Hospital, Riley is asked to operate on Justin Morgan, the brother of his former partner Tessa Lee, now known as Tori. Tori explains to Riley that she and her brothers had to go into witness protection after their parents were shot. Riley tells Nate Cooper that he and Tori used to be a couple, and that he wants her back. He also apologises to Tori for cheating on her. When Justin learns Riley is in town, he warns him to stay away from Tori. Riley later treats Justin when he is admitted with an infection. He also tells Tori that Nate tried to make a bet with him about her, but she soon realises that he lied. Riley performs a bronchoscopy on Billie Ashford (Tessa de Josselin) and finds a mass in her airway. Tori and Riley go on a lunch date, where he asks her for another chance, but she is cautious due to his history. Brody Morgan (Jackson Heywood) sees Riley flirting with Evelyn MacGuire (Philippa Northeast) at Billie's wake, and tells him not to mess Tori around again. Shortly after they get back together, Riley asks Tori to move to the city with him. She turns him down for the sake of her family. Riley then sees her and Nate talking and hugging. He amends Billie's notes and then makes a formal complaint in an attempt to get Nate fired for medical negligence. Tori proves the notes were doctored and when Riley admits that he did it, she breaks up with him. When he shows up at her house, Tori tells him to get out of her life. Justin overhears them arguing and fights with Riley, before Tori orders him to leave. Riley quits his job at the hospital and leaves town.

Scarlett Snow

Scarlett Snow, played by Tania Nolan, made her first appearance on 8 May 2017. Nolan was living in Los Angeles when she learned the role was available. She flew to Sydney, where the show is filmed, for a screen test. She returned to Los Angeles the following day, but soon learned she had won the role and had to fly back to Sydney two days later. Nolan was contracted for six months and she finished filming in May. Nolan described her character as "a bit of a mystery", and explained that no one knows why she is in the Bay, but she has suffered a tragedy in her past that she is dealing with. Nolan accepted the part and relocated to Sydney because of the character's "unique" storyline. The actress added, "I could relate to certain things Scarlett has been through. Not specifically, but unfortunately I know what it's like to go through what she went through.".

Brody Morgan (Jackson Heywood) jumps into Scarlett's car and orders her to drive, as he is avoiding the police. Scarlett pulls the car over and offers Brody her handbag, which he takes. Brody goes to Scarlett's house to return the handbag, but Scarlett hits him over the head with a vase and ties him up. She threatens to call the police, and Brody opens up to her about his drug addiction. She makes him call his family and then frees him. Brody leaves with William Zannis (Caleb Alloway), who he says is his brother, and Scarlett thinks he is going to get help. The police track down Scarlett and ask her about the carjacking. She tells them she did not get a good look at the carjacker. Scarlett finds Brody sleeping on the beach, and he blames her for his arrest. She buys him a coffee and takes him back to her house. She then visits his family and brings them to him. Mason Morgan (Orpheus Pledger) suggests that Brody stays with Scarlett and she agrees. Scarlett disapproves of the way Justin Morgan (James Stewart) handles Brody's addiction. Alf Stewart (Ray Meagher) tells Scarlett off for spear fishing in the wrong place. When she enquires about hiring a boat, Alf tells her she can borrow one for free if she can get it mended. Scarlett reluctantly hires Justin to help her.

Brody relapses and flees shortly before Scarlett finds he has ransacked the house, and stolen $10,000 and a bracelet. Her landlord asks her to leave, and Alf gives her a caravan at the Summer Bay Caravan Park, as well as a job at his bait shop. Bruno Addlen (Johnny Nasser) turns up in the Bay looking for Scarlett, having been hired by her husband. Bruno asks for $8000 to leave and keep her whereabouts a secret. Alf offers to lend Scarlett the money, but she turns him down. Tori later thanks Scarlett for helping Brody secure a lawyer and tells her the family will repay the money Brody stole, which allows Scarlett to pay Bruno. Scarlett bonds with Justin's daughter Ava Gilbert (Grace Thomas) when she visits him. Scarlett later listens to a voicemail message from her son, Max (Addison Price). While working on the boat together, Justin accidentally causes Scarlett's phone to fall into the sea. He retrieves it and gets it working again. He also notices that she has a son and questions her about it, causing Scarlett to slap him. She later apologises and decides to leave town, until Justin asks her to stay. Scarlett's estranged husband sends another private investigator after her, as he wants her to come home. Justin helps her to get out of the Bay and Scarlett tells him that her son died a year ago. Justin admits that he cares for her and allows Scarlett to take his car. Scarlett returns a week later and gets drunk on the anniversary of Max's death. She wakes up in Justin's bed and assumes they had sex, but he explains that she took a shower and fell asleep, while he slept on the couch. Scarlett apologises for over-reacting and tells Justin how her marriage broke down because of Max's death. Alf and Justin take Scarlett out in the boat for some fishing. When they attempt to leave, their boat fails to start and they have to spend the night on the beach. Alf is attacked by Robbo (Jake Ryan), who also scares Scarlett. Justin fixes the boat and they return home.

Scarlett attempts to kiss Justin, but he rejects her advances, later explaining that he still loves his former fiancée, Phoebe Nicholson (Isabella Giovinazzo). He later changes his mind and they go back to Scarlett's caravan, but Justin calls out Phoebe's name and they stop. After avoiding each other, Scarlett and Justin decide to give their relationship a chance. They go swimming, but Justin hits his head and does not resurface. Scarlett pulls him out and gets him breathing again, but she suffers a flashback to her son's death. Scarlett and Kat move in together, and Scarlett offers to be Brody's lawyer at his court case. After Brody is accused of stabbing someone, Scarlett looks at Kat's police files and then goes to a drug den to find the weapon. She and Kat briefly fall out. While Scarlett and Justin are celebrating Brody's suspended sentence, they are interrupted by the arrival of her estranged husband Caleb Snow (Josh McConville). Scarlett spends time with Caleb and they later meet over dinner, where Caleb brings her Max's stuffed toy, causing Scarlett to leave. Caleb reveals that he has been seeing a counsellor. Scarlett, Justin, Kat and Robbo go away to a cabin in the bush, where a bomb explodes and causes a piece of wood to pierce Scarlett's shoulder. While Justin looks after her, she calls out Caleb's name. Justin later breaks up with Scarlett, telling her that he cares for her, but their relationship will not work because of Caleb. Scarlett tells Caleb that she has feelings for Justin, but Caleb kisses her and tells her he wants her to move back home. Scarlett realises that Justin is right and she decides to leave the Bay with Caleb.

Ziggy Astoni

Ziggy Astoni, played by Sophie Dillman, made her first appearance on 20 June 2017. Details about Ziggy were released in June. Ziggy is the eldest daughter of Ben (Rohan Nichol) and Maggie Astoni (Kestie Morassi). The Astonis are the first nuclear family to join the soap opera in 17 years, since the arrival of the Sutherlands in 2000. Karlie Rutherford of The Daily Telegraph described Ziggy as a "wild child" and a "rebel teenager". Ziggy was also a potential love interest for Brody Morgan (Jackson Heywood).

Ben Astoni

Ben Astoni, played by Rohan Nichol, made his first appearance on 20 June 2017. Nichol previously appeared in the show in 2004 as Stafford McRae. He relocated from Melbourne to Manly, so he would be closer to the show's outdoor filming location, Palm Beach for the role. Ben moves to Summer Bay along with his wife Maggie (Kestie Morassi) and their two daughters Coco (Anna Cocquerel) and Ziggy Astoni (Sophie Dillman). The Astonis are the first nuclear family to join the soap opera in 17 years, since the arrival of the Sutherlands in 2000. Nichol called Ben "a good guy, he's a guy I'd like to have a beer with! I like the fact that Ben is very loyal and he's a lover. He's very in love with his wife."

Maggie Astoni

Maggie Astoni, played by Kestie Morassi, made her first appearance on 21 June 2017. Morassi's casting was revealed in early 2017 when she was pictured filming on set, while her character details were announced on 4 June. Morassi told Luke Dennehy of Herald Sun that it took some time for her to get used to the fast-paced filming schedule of the show. She commented, "It was definitely a shock to the system. I'm mostly used to working on film, where you have a lot more time for rehearsals. With film you are shooting maybe three minutes a day, whereas here, you are shooting almost an episode a day." Maggie moves to Summer Bay with her husband Ben Astoni (Rohan Nichol) and their two daughters Coco (Anna Cocquerel) and Ziggy Astoni (Sophie Dillman). The Astonis are the first nuclear family to join the soap opera in 17 years, since the arrival of the Sutherlands in 2000.

Coco Astoni

Coco Astoni, played by Anna Cocquerel, made her first appearance on 21 June 2017. Coco is the youngest daughter of Ben (Rohan Nichol) and Maggie Astoni (Kestie Morassi). The Astonis are the first nuclear family to join the soap opera in 17 years, since the arrival of the Sutherlands in 2000. Imogen Groome of the Metro reported that Coco could be a new love interest for VJ. In December 2018, Cocquerel confirmed that she would be reducing her filming hours while she completes Year 12 of school. She said, "I'll still be in the Bay, but I'm also at a regular school with all of my friends."

Coco is suspended from school for cyber-bullying another student. When Ziggy and Coco fight, their father, Ben, puts Coco's phone in the blender and turns it on. Ben and his wife, Maggie, decide to get away from the city and the family ends up in Summer Bay. Coco befriends Raffy Morrison (Olivia Deeble). Ben and Maggie decide to move the family to the Bay. Coco meets VJ Patterson and Raffy tells him that she is her French tutor. Coco plays along and VJ asks her out on a date. His mother, Leah Patterson-Baker (Ada Nicodemou) interrupts their date and reveals that Coco is only 16. She leaves the restaurant and later apologises to VJ. On her first day at Summer Bay High, Coco is embarrassed when her mother calls her by her nickname "Coco Pops". Jennifer Dutton (Brittany Santariga) then teases her about it and Raffy attempts to stand up for Coco, who tells her to get lost. Coco and Raffy make up when Coco offers to cover for Raffy, while she leaves the school. Jennifer continues bullying Coco and Raffy stands up for her. As Coco is teased for her appearance, she begins binge eating and making herself sick. She and Jennifer are suspended when they get into a fight at the beach.

Jennifer later realises that Coco has an eating disorder. She says that she will not tell anyone, if Coco can set her up on a date with VJ. Coco agrees and Jennifer's negative attitude towards her changes, causing strain on Coco and Raffy's friendship. During a surf lesson with VJ and Jennifer, Coco faints. She faints again while out jogging, causing her to fall down some stairs and fracture her wrist. She almost passes out again, but is caught by Robbo (Jake Ryan), who takes her to the hospital. Raffy and Coco mend their friendship. Coco continues to binge and make herself sick, and Leah later catches her doing. Leah tries to convince Coco to tell Ben and Maggie, but she refuses and begs Leah to keep it quiet. Leah offers her support and tells her to call if she is attempted to binge again. Coco discovers that Ziggy was involved in an incident at their old school in which Maggie was injured. Coco asks Ziggy to come clean, but Ziggy tells her that it will tear their family apart. While working outside, Coco collapses and suffers a seizure. At the hospital, Coco finally admits that she has bulimia. Coco blames Ziggy for putting their mother under stress. While Coco is at the Surf Club, she meets Ryder Jackson (Lukas Radovich) and he buys her a drink. Coco and Ryder later meet up at the Diner, where he asks her for her phone number. When he calls, Coco gets Ben to scare him off. Coco and Raffy soon befriend Ryder. When he overhears them organising a girls movie night, he invites himself along. Coco asks Raffy if she likes Ryder and Raffy replies that he is cool and asks Coco if she likes Ryder too, but Coco denies it. But after seeing Raffy and Ryder getting closer, Coco become jealous and leaves early. At home, Maggie catches Coco about to binge eat. Coco tells Raffy about her bulimia and that she also likes Ryder. Coco hosts a Glow Day event to raise money for charity. Raffy informs Coco that she told Ryder that she is not interested in dating him, so Coco can pursue Ryder.

Coco, along with Ben and Ziggy supports Maggie when she's diagnosed with cancer. Coco and Ryder then start dating, but later broke up when she starts talking to another guy when she was on camp. Coco was happy when Ziggy is engaged to Brody Morgan (Jackson Heywood) and was Ziggy's maid of honour at her wedding. Whilst Ziggy was on her honeymoon with Brody, Maggie was sick and Coco calls Ziggy to come home. Coco and Ryder gets back together, but soon broke up. Coco was hurt when Ryder and Raffy starts dating, but gives them her blessing. Coco decided to go to boarding school in Cairns, and Ben and Ziggy was happy for her, but Maggie refuses to let her go, but later changes her mind and Coco leaves to go to boarding school.

Months later, Coco returns to the Bay for Raffy's birthday party and lashes out at Brody for cheating on Ziggy with Simone Bedford (Emily Eskell). Coco continues to badmouth about Simone, calling her a "tramp". Brody tells Coco that she should be angry at him, not Simone. Coco cracks and telling them that they do not deserve to be happy. Coco apologise to Raffy for making a scene. Coco talks with Ziggy about her new relationship with Dean Thompson (Patrick O'Connor), and she later tells Bella Nixon (Courtney Miller) that it is only a fling. Coco later returns to boarding school. In 2020, Ben and Maggie called Coco to join them in Italy for a fresh start. But Coco declines their offer. Ben and Maggie flew to Cairns to see Coco before departing for Italy. The following year, Ziggy flew to Cairns to visit Coco for a few days.

Robbo

Robbo (also John Doe), played by Jake Ryan, made his first appearance on 25 July 2017. Ryan admitted that he was not prepared for the fame that will come from appearing on the show, saying "Sometimes these bad boy characters can work in your favour and maybe no one will like me." He also told Karlie Rutherford of news.com.au that he lost 13 kg ahead of his debut, after gaining weight following an injury that ended his taekwondo career. Producers introduced Robbo in a bid to fill "the heart-throb void" left by Darryl Braxton (Stephen Peacocke). Ryan previously auditioned for the role of Brax, and he said, "Both characters have been painted with the bad boy brush... but they're very different." Robbo also became Kat's new love interest. The character was killed off in the opening episodes of the 33rd season, broadcast on 27 January 2020. In an interview with Maddison Hockey and Tamara Cullen of TV Week, Ryan admitted that he left Home and Away as his "time was done there". He did not think there was much more for his character to do and he liked that he went out "on a high". He added, "It's been an incredible ride. But you have to know when to call it with characters and I've been so fortunate with the storylines I had."

John Doe watches on as Alf Stewart (Ray Meagher), Scarlett Snow (Tania Nolan) and Justin Morgan (James Stewart) approach the cove, where he is hiding out, in a boat. While they are fishing, John Doe attempts to hot-wire the boat, but gives up when he sees Justin approaching. The boat fails to start and Alf, Scarlett and Justin camp out on the island. When Alf goes in search of firewood the following morning, John Doe hits him with a tree branch and takes his knife. He hides on the boat and emerges once it is docked in Summer Bay. John Doe breaks into the Pier Diner to steal some food, and Alf later finds him hiding on the boat. He pushes past Alf and Justin and later follows Alf to his house, where he produces the knife. John Doe tells Alf that he cannot recall who he is and needs answers. Alf's daughter Roo Stewart (Georgie Parker) and Constable Kat Chapman (Pia Miller) approach the scene and Kat talks him into giving her the knife. She calls Tori Morgan (Penny McNamee) to treat John Doe's head injury, and Tori takes him to the hospital to get a CT scan, as he is suffering from post-traumatic amnesia. He later leaves the hospital, but Kat convinces him to return. Kat runs his finger prints and DNA against the police database, but there are no hits. The nurses name him "Robbo" after Robinson Crusoe and he is discharged. Alf allows Robbo to stay at the Caravan Park.

Robbo decides to leave the Bay, but after saving Raffy Morrison (Olivia Deeble) from Mackenzie (Luke Davis), he decides to stay and wait to see if any information comes back about his tattoos. Kat and Scarlett take Robbo back to the cove and search his campsite. Kat finds a picture of herself, but Robbo does not know why he has it. John Palmer (Shane Withington) and Marilyn Chambers (Emily Symons) try to help Robbo figure out who he is, but when John attempts to teach him how to drive, Robbo backs the car into Kat's police cruiser. While taking him to the station, Kat stops off at a motel to find Brody Morgan (Jackson Heywood). Robbo notices Faz (Jesse Rowles) leave the room, and when he and Bob (Neal Horton) emerge with Brody and Ziggy Astoni (Sophie Dillman), Robbo attacks them. William Zannis (Caleb Alloway) pulls a gun, but Robbo disarms him, leading Kat to think Robbo might have been a police officer. Alf offers Robbo a job doing maintenance work around the Caravan Park. After Kat breaks up with her boyfriend Martin Ashford (George Mason), Robbo comes to her caravan and offers her a bottle of whiskey. They kiss, but Kat tells him it was a mistake. Scarlett offers to help Robbo and later gets a hit on one of his tattoos, which is connected to a woman called Rose. She gives him a list of addresses and Kat helps him out. At the second address, Robbo finds a burnt photo that shows his arm around a woman. He and Kat then find her body inside. Robbo decides to give up searching for information about his past and asks Kat to close the investigation. Robbo helps Coco Astoni (Anna Cocquerel) to the hospital when she faints at the beach.

During an overnight trip in the bush with Kat, Scarlett, and Justin, their cabin is set fire to by a stranger who Robbo chases down. He tells him his real name is Beckett Reid, and escapes before he can ask more. The man, whose name is revealed to be Dennis Novak, returns and targets Kat. After confronting him, he tells Robbo they were partners in crime, and urges him to come back. After he kidnaps and attempts to murder Kat, Robbo saves her and kills Novak, burying him in the bush. As the police uncover Novak's death, they close in on Robbo as the prime suspect. After Kat and Ash discover proof of his guilt, he tries to convince her to flee the Bay with him, but she refuses. After kidnapping and releasing Tori with an address for Kat, he escapes, but returns to confront Kat and asks her to come with him. She again refuses and he hands himself into the police; however, Kat frees him and they drive off together. As they are leaving the Bay, they are involved in a major car accident, which leaves them both injured. Kat begs Robbo to leave her, so he will not be arrested. He reaches the house where he and Kat were going to start a new life and waits for her. He later contacts the hospital and Tori informs him that Kat and her baby have died. Robbo mourns them, while Ash swears to find Robbo and exact his revenge. Robbo returns to the Bay and collapses in Tori's garden due to an infection. Tori hides him in the garage and treats his injuries. Justin plans to get him out of town in the boot of a car with help from Willow Harris (Sarah Roberts). As Robbo is about to take the car and leave, he finds a photo of himself with a woman and two children. He becomes unresponsive and Willow decides to hide him in a motel in the Bay. Robbo eventually tells Tori that the people in the photo are his wife and children. After learning that Ash is searching the local area for him, Tori and Willow take Robbo back to the Morgan's house. Robbo is finally able to recall that his real name is Ryan Shaw and that his family are dead. As he goes to hand himself in to the police, he is spotted by Ash, who chases him up to the headland. Robbo gives in and prepares for Ash to beat him, but the police arrive and arrest them both. However Robbo is later released on bail until his trial.

At the near conclusion of Robbo's trial, with the jury having reached a verdict, and the Judge about to read it out, the Australian Federal Police (AFP) unexpectedly storm into the courtroom and hastily seize Robbo. An AFP officer tells Tori to forget Beckett Reid ever existed as Robbo is rushed into an unmarked police van. Robbo is taken to an unknown AFP base and is cuffed to a table in an interview room. During the interview, his memories start coming back as he sees dozen of pictures of him and his family. An AFP officer, Lance Salisbury (Angus McLaren), tells Robbo that he is an AFP officer. Lance confirms to Robbo that his real name is Ryan Shaw, and explains that Robbo was working undercover as Beckett Reid to track down the people that killed his family. His real identity was completely wiped off of the system like he never existed. A new fictional identity was created as part of the cover story to ensure the crimes that he had supposedly committed never actually happened, and that no one knew he is an AFP officer. Additionally, it is further revealed that Robbo was sent to Summer Bay to protect Kat as part of his undercover mission, but everything went wrong when he lost his memories. Robbo returns to the Bay, accompanied by Lance, for unfinished business. Lance returns all of his belongings, including his real passport, driver's licence, and credit cards. Additionally, Lance gives back Robbo's AFP ID badge and advises him to think about returning to AFP. Robbo soon approaches Ash to tell him everything, but Ash refuses to listen to him, but eventually goes with Robbo to hear the truth where he finds out Robbo was a AFP officer. Robbo decides not to return to the AFP and purchases the local gym instead. He finds support from Jasmine Delaney (Sam Frost) and they become close, but she tells him that she just wants to be friends. However, she realises that she has romantic feelings for him and they start a relationship. Shortly after Tori asks Robbo if he would father a child with her using IVF and he agrees. Tori becomes pregnant, but she later has a miscarriage and Robbo decides he does not want to try again. He proposes to Jasmine, who accepts. Robbo later learns that Tori used a second embryo to get pregnant again and that Jasmine knew. He ends their engagement and leaves the Bay. Robbo returns two months later for Tori's first ultrasound at the hospital. Jasmine sees him and leaves, refusing to talk to him. Robbo tries to talk to her, but Jasmine struggles with his presence and admits that his departure brought up memories of her father leaving her when she was young. The couple eventually reconcile and get married, but during the reception the AFP arrive and escort Robbo, Jasmine and Tori to a safe house. Robbo later does hypnotherapy to try and remember what happened to Dylan Carter, the first try is unsuccessful when he attacks Alex Neilson (Zoe Ventoura). But the second try they tie Robbo to the chair and are successful. Robbo was involved in a car accident and was taken to the hospital, his surgery was successful but Robbo later suffers from a hemorrhage and despite the doctors best efforts to revive him, he dies, he later appears to Jasmine in a dream.

Jennifer Dutton

Jennifer Dutton, played by Brittany Santariga, made her first appearance on 27 July 2017. Santariga's casting was confirmed in June 2017 when she was photographed filming alongside actors Matt Little and Anna Cocquerel at Palm Beach, the show's outdoor location. Jennifer was introduced as a high school student, who bullies Cocquerel's character Coco Astoni. Carley Duffy of 2Day FM reported Jennifer would later become a love interest for Hunter King (Scott Lee). She also added that Santariga "already caused quite a stir at Summer Bay High playing the role of bully Jennifer."

Jennifer teases Coco Astoni after her mother and school principal, Maggie Astoni (Kestie Morassi), calls her by her embarrassing nickname, "Coco Pops" on her first day. Jennifer tells Coco that she has been given a detention from Maggie and Coco pushes her books to the floor, before VJ Patterson (Little) breaks up the confrontation. Jennifer puts rubbish in Coco's locker and teases her about her social media photos. Raffy Morrison (Olivia Deeble) stands up to Jennifer on Coco's behalf, calling her "Jenny" as she knows Jennifer hates it. Jennifer insults Coco's appearance and weight. Coco starts a fight with Jennifer, which is broken up by Maggie. She suspends them both and Jennifer's father Nick (Jacob Allan) collects her from school. Jennifer realises Coco has an eating disorder and threatens to reveal it, unless Coco gets her a date with VJ. Coco agrees and she begins to spend time with Jennifer, which causes a strain on her friendship with Raffy. Jennifer has a surfing lesson with VJ and Coco, and she helps Coco after she faints on the beach. During Olivia Fraser Richards' (Raechelle Banno) fashion line launch party at Salt, Jennifer encourages Raffy to drink alcohol, causing her to get drunk. The next day, Raffy confronts Jennifer and pushes her, which Maggie witnesses. Jennifer attends Summer Bay's Glow Day, hosted by Coco. She is paired with Ryder Jackson (Lukas Radovich) for the obstacle course, and he causes her to fall and sprain her wrist. Jennifer flirts with Raffy's brother Mason Morgan (Orpheus Pledger) when he treats her. Jennifer then trains with Mason at the gym, where she kisses him. Mason pushes her away, as he is still grieving for his late girlfriend and Jennifer apologises. Jennifer comforts Hunter King after Olivia rejects his marriage proposal. Jennifer and Mason support Hunter in the wake of his break up, and Hunter helps Jennifer with her studies. While they are at the beach together, Jennifer kisses Hunter and asks him to come to Diner to help her with an assignment. Hunter mistakenly assumes it is a date, so Jennifer invites him to go on a real date and he accepts. The two start dating, much dismay to Olivia. Jennifer attends to a university party with Hunter, where Nick finds her and accuse Hunter of giving Jennifer alcohol and telling him to stay away before taking her home. Jennifer runs away from home and moves in the Summer Bay House with Hunter. But she was later kicked out by Alf Stewart (Ray Meagher), when he walks in on her and Hunter making out. Hunter breaks up with her and she moves out and became homeless. Jennifer decided to move back in with Nick and says goodbye to Hunter before she leaves.

Beth Ellis

Elizabeth "Beth" Ellis, played by Anneliese Apps, made her first appearance on 31 August 2017. The actress secured the role five months after graduating from Western Australian Academy of Performing Arts. She initially thought she had performed badly in the audition, but received a callback, which she felt had gone well. She learned she had won the role a week later.

Apps was excited for the audience to meet Beth and said her storyline was "moving". Describing her character, Apps stated "Beth is cheeky, layered and she wants to make the people around her feel good. She is mysterious, perhaps even a bit quirky, like me – I'm not that mysterious, but I'm definitely a bit quirky." Beth was also introduced as a love interest for Mason Morgan (Pledger). Apps told a columnist for New Idea that Beth wants to help Mason, as she sees part of herself in him.

While she is at the hospital, Beth overhears Mason Morgan shouting at his siblings about his paralysis. She later changes into some nursing scrubs and attempts to cheer Mason up. Beth convinces him to get in the wheelchair and they race around the corridors. Mason meets Beth again and they spend some more time together. It emerges Beth is a patient when she returns to her room to continue her treatment. Beth and Mason spend more time together, and he introduces her to his sister Tori Morgan (Penny McNamee). Beth keeps up the pretence that she is a nurse, but Mason later finds her in her room undergoing a procedure. He attempts to look at her file and Beth catches him. She tells Mason that she has cardiomyopathy and is waiting for a heart transplant. Beth explains that she liked pretending to be someone else, as she did not want Mason to pity her. They agree to start their friendship over. Beth encourages Mason to forgive his brother Brody Morgan (Jackson Heywood) for causing the crash that paralysed him. Mason finds Beth's bucket list and arranges for them to get tattoos together. Beth kisses him during their dinner date, and they later go skinny dipping. When Beth asks Mason what he would put on his bucket list, Mason arranges for them to get dressed up and go to a casino. Beth cancels a hospital appointment for the trip, but during the drive she becomes short of breath and faints. Mason helps Beth into the back seat of the car and he is forced to drive them to Tori, who helps transfer Beth to an ambulance. Beth later visits Mason to let him know she is okay. Mason introduces her to his siblings as his girlfriend.

When Mason sees Beth and her father, Alan Ellis (Blair McDonough) together, he introduces himself and realises that Beth has not told her parents about their relationship. Beth tells Mason that she knew they would want her to focus on her health. Alan invites Mason to lunch and Beth's mother Jackie (Rachael Coopes) joins them. Mason later tells Beth that Alan asked him to stay away from her, so she confronts her father and tells him that she is not breaking up with Mason. Beth collapses and is admitted to the hospital, where Tori informs her that she needs a stent. Beth's condition worsens and she is moved up the transplant list. When Beth is feeling better, Mason is given permission to take her out for the afternoon. Mason arranges for them to have lunch on the beach, where he gives Beth a promise ring. Beth suddenly becomes short of breath and Mason gets her back to the hospital, where she suffers a sudden fatal arrhythmia and dies. After her funeral, Mason sees a vision of Beth in his room, she tells him to move on in his life.

Ryder Jackson

Ryder Jackson, played by Lukas Radovich, made his first appearance on 25 October 2017. The character and Radovich's casting details were announced on 23 October. Radovich secured the part shortly after graduating from the Western Australian Academy of Performing Arts and it marks his first acting role. Ryder is the son of Quinn Jackson (Lara Cox) and grandson of Alf Stewart (Ray Meagher). His first scenes see him break into the Surf Club. When he is later caught for trying to steal from Hunter King (Scott Lee) and VJ Patterson (Matt Little), Ryder explains that he is Alf's grandson. Ryder refuses to give out Quinn's phone number, which leads his aunt Roo Stewart (Georgie Parker) to suspect he has run away.

Willow Harris

Willow Harris (also Ranger), played by Sarah Roberts, made her first appearance on 14 November 2017. Prior to securing the role of Willow, Roberts auditioned for both Kat Chapman and Scarlett Snow. She flew up from Melbourne to Sydney for the audition and had a chemistry reading with James Stewart, who plays Justin Morgan. Roberts did not think she had won the part, as it took a while for the producers to contact her. Roberts described Willow as a "strong, female character", who is also independent, loyal and fierce. The actress said Willow would bring "mischief and a bit of trouble" to Summer Bay. Roberts added that Willow was "definitely a bad girl. But for all the right reasons. She has taken wrong turns and made decisions that some people would consider 'bad', but only to help the people that she loves." She soon becomes a love interest for Justin Morgan.

Jasmine Delaney

Jasmine Delaney, played by Sam Frost, made her first appearance on 18 December 2017. Frost's casting was announced on 17 July 2017. She was asked to audition for the show while she was appearing on Hell's Kitchen Australia. Frost did not think she would win the role, after going up against several actresses, but she was told that she had secured the part after a second audition. Frost commented "I grew up watching Home and Away and never in my wildest dreams did I think I would be on set and part of the cast." The role marks Frost's acting debut. Frost's casting attracted criticism from some actors, who dubbed it a publicity stunt. Jasmine's first scenes saw her involved in a car crash that results in the death of Kat Chapman, played by Pia Miller. Frost described Jasmine as "quite guarded", with "an anxious energy." She is hiding secrets and has "a dark past".

Others

References

External links
Characters and cast at the Official AU Home and Away website
Characters and cast at the Internet Movie Database
Ben Astoni at the Official AU Home and Away website
Coco Astoni at the Official AU Home and Away website
Ziggy Astoni at the Official AU Home and Away website

, 2017
, Home and Away
2017 in Australian television